KERIS is the Korea Education and Research Information Service.

Keris may also refer to:

 Keris, the orthographically correct original Javanese spelling for the Kris, the traditional dagger of Java, Indonesia
 Keris Mas (1922-1992), Malaysian writer